Winder is an unincorporated community in Franklin County, in the U.S. state of Idaho.

History
The community was named after John R. Winder, a Mormon leader.

References

Unincorporated communities in Franklin County, Idaho